The list of ship decommissionings in 2017 includes a chronological list of ships decommissioned in 2017.

References

2017
 
Ships